Gordon Row (also known as Gordon Block) is a historic row house in Savannah, Georgia, United States. The largest single row house in Savannah, it comprises fifteen homes (or "units") located between 101 and 129 West Gordon Street in the southeastern residential block of Chatham Square. Completed in 1854, it is a contributing property of the Savannah Historic District, itself on the National Register of Historic Places, as are its standing carriage houses to the rear. The row occupies the entire block between Barnard Street on the west and Whitaker Street on the east and sits directly opposite Chatham Square to Quantock Row on Taylor Street.

The properties were built between 1853 and 1855 for prospective use as renter-occupied houses in the city's blossoming market.

After falling into disrepair, the properties were renovated in the mid-20th century by the Historic Savannah Foundation.

Other similar-style row houses exist in Savannah's Scudder's Row, the two Quantock Rows (of Taylor Street and Jones Street), William Remshart Row House, McDonough Row and Marshall Row.

Gallery

References

See also
Buildings in Savannah Historic District

Landmarks in Savannah, Georgia
Houses in Savannah, Georgia
Houses completed in 1854
Chatham Square (Savannah) buildings
Savannah Historic District